Lars Hamann (born 4 April 1989) is a German track and field athlete who competes in the javelin throw. His personal best is 86.71 m.

Career
He has represented his nation at two World Championships (2013 and 2015), missing out on the final on both occasions. He competed for Germany at the 2016 European Championships, where he finished twentieth in qualifying and did not advance to the final.

Competition record

Seasonal bests by year
2006 - 67.18
2007 - 68.40
2008 - 71.03
2009 - 74.23
2010 - 77.24
2011 - 74.85
2012 - 79.55
2013 - 84.20
2014 - 79.65
2015 - 84.26
2016 - 85.79
2017 - '''86.71

References

German male javelin throwers
Living people
Place of birth missing (living people)
1989 births
World Athletics Championships athletes for Germany
People from Meissen
Sportspeople from Saxony